The women's hammer throw at the 2010 European Athletics Championships was held at the Estadi Olímpic Lluís Companys on 28 and 30 July.

Medalists

Records

Schedule

Results

Qualification
Qualification: Qualification Performance 69.00 (Q) or at least 12 best performers advance to the final

Final

References
 Qualification Results
 Final Results
Full results

Hammer throw
Hammer throw at the European Athletics Championships
2010 in women's athletics